Unitary equivalence may refer to:
Unitary equivalence of bounded operators in Hilbert space; see self-adjoint operator
Unitary equivalence of a unitary representation